Sargent Township is one of nine townships in Douglas County, Illinois, USA.  As of the 2010 census, its population was 286 and it contained 127 housing units.  The township contains Walnut Point State Park.

Geography

Cemeteries
The township contains these three cemeteries: Albin, Gwinn and Pleasant Grove.

Major highways
  Illinois Route 133

State parks
 Walnut Point State Park

Demographics

School districts
 Villa Grove Community Unit School District                          * Oakland Community Unit School District 5
 Shiloh Community Unit School District 1

Political districts
 State House District 110
 State Senate District 55

References
 
 United States Census Bureau 2009 TIGER/Line Shapefiles
 United States National Atlas

External links
 City-Data.com
 Illinois State Archives
 Township Officials of Illinois

Townships in Douglas County, Illinois
Townships in Illinois